Thomas or Tom Baker may refer to:

Politicians
Thomas Cheseman or Thomas Baker ( 1488–1536 or later), Member of Parliament for Rye
Thomas Baker (died 1625), Member of Parliament for Arundel
Tom Baker (Nebraska politician) (born 1948), member of Nebraska Legislature
Thomas Guillaume St. Barbe Baker (1895–1966), Fascist activist and former British Army and RAF officer
Colonel Thomas Baker (1810–1872), founder of Bakersfield, California

Sports
Thomas Baker (cricketer) (born 1981), English cricketer who played for Yorkshire County Cricket Club and Northamptonshire County Cricket Club
Tom Baker (footballer, born 1934), Wales international football player, commonly called George
 Tom Baker (bowler) (born 1954), American bowler
 Tom Baker (1930s pitcher) (1913–1991), Major League Baseball pitcher for the Brooklyn Dodgers and New York Giants
 Tom Baker (1960s pitcher) (1934–1980), Major League Baseball pitcher for the Chicago Cubs
 Tom Baker (footballer, born 1905) (1905–1975), British footballer
 Thomas Southey Baker (1848–1902), English amateur rower and footballer

Military
Thomas Baker (Royal Navy officer) (1771–1845), Royal Navy admiral
Thomas Durand Baker (1837–1893), Quartermaster-General to the Forces
 Thomas Baker (Medal of Honor recipient) (1916–1944), World War II Medal of Honor recipient
 Thomas Baker (aviator) (1897–1918), Australian soldier and aviator of the First World War
 Thomas Baker (general) (born 1935), United States Air Force general

Religion
Thomas Baker (missionary) (1832–1867), English Christian missionary cannibalised in Fiji
Sir Thomas Baker (Unitarian) (1810–1886), English Unitarian minister and Mayor of Manchester
 Thomas Nelson Baker Sr. (1860–1941), African-American minister, author and philosopher
Tom Baker (priest) (1920–2000), Anglican clergyman

Actors
Tom Baker (born 1934), played The Doctor on Doctor Who from 1974 to 1981
Tom Baker (American actor) (1940–1982)

Education
 Tom Baker (professor) (born 1959), law professor at the University of Pennsylvania Law School
 Thomas E. Baker, professor of Constitutional law and former administrative assistant to William Rehnquist
 Thomas Baker (college president) (1871–1939), president of Carnegie Mellon University
 Thomas Baker (entomologist), American professor at Penn State University

Others
Thomas Baker (antiquarian) (1656–1740), English antiquarian
Thomas Baker (artist) (1809–1864), English landscape painter and watercolourist
Thomas Baker (Peasants' Revolt leader) (died 1381), English landowner
Thomas Baker (musician), composer and producer of musical stage productions
Thomas Baker (mathematician) (1625?–1689), English mathematician
Thomas Baker (dramatist) (c. 1680–1749), English dramatist and lawyer

Other uses
Tom Baker Cancer Centre, a hospital in Canada
Tom Baker (24 character)
DC Tom Baker, a character on The Bill
Tom Baker, protagonist in the 2003 film Cheaper by the Dozen and its sequel
"Tom Baker", a song by Human League on some versions of Travelogue